The U.S. Army Museum of Hawaii (HAMS) is housed inside Battery Randolph, a former coastal artillery battery, located at Fort DeRussy Military Reservation. The battery was transformed into a museum in 1976. The museum's collection contains some World War II armor pieces, an AH-1 Cobra helicopter, and small arms indoors, as well as the battery itself.  The battery's main guns were scrapped prior to the inception of the museum.

Museum exhibits cover the military history of pre-Imperial Hawaii and the post-annexation history of US Army warfare in the Pacific hemisphere including World War II, Vietnam, and Korea.  The museum also includes a "Gallery of Heroes" honoring recipients of the Medal of Honor and the Distinguished Service Cross.

The museum shares space with the Regional Visitor Center of the US Army Corps of Engineers Pacific Division, which exhibits information about key Army Corps projects in Hawaii and the Pacific region. It is maintained by the US Army Center for Military History and the US Army Garrison in Hawai’i.

The Hawai’i Army Museum Society (HAMS) was chartered in 1976 by a group of military veterans and patriotic citizens. Its mission is to support the US Army Museum of Hawai’i.

Admission is free, and the museum is open most Tuesdays, not following a Monday holiday, through Saturday.  It is located on Kalia Road, coordinates  adjacent to the Hale Koa Hotel.  Parking is located across the street.

Other Army museums
See: National Museum of the United States Army#Other Army museums

References

Hawaii
Museums in Honolulu
Military and war museums in Hawaii
Coastal artillery